Calosima elyella is a moth in the family Blastobasidae. It is found in the United States, including Connecticut, Maryland, New Jersey, Florida, Illinois and Maine.

References

Moths described in 1910
elyella